The Golden Vale is an area of rolling pastureland in the civil province of Munster, southwestern Ireland. Covering parts of three counties, Limerick, Tipperary and Cork, it is the best land in Ireland for dairy farming. Historically it has been called the Golden Vein. An early instance is an 1837 book by Jonathan Binns, a British government official, where he refers to the area as '"the golden vale" (more correctly the "golden vein")' and states "The land is of excellent quality, being part of the golden vein of Ireland—a district reaching from Tipperary towards Limerick. The extent of the golden vein is about fourteen miles long, by six or seven wide." (i.e. 23 × 10 km; an area of 58,000 acres or 236 km2) Some subsequent writers similarly prefer "vein".

The Golden Vale is bordered in the east by the Galtee Mountains, with the Glen of Aherlow as a picturesque abutting valley. The Munster Blackwater valley is the Vale's southern part. Towns in the Golden Vale include Charleville, Mitchelstown, Kilmallock and Tipperary. From Tipperary town to Golden, and then south to Cahir, Mitchelstown, Kildorrery, Mallow and Charleville, this 'square' could be considered the best land in Ireland. In 1739, Walter Harris suggested the "Golden" name was a corruption of Gowlin, former name of a village now called Golden, from  "little fork [in the River Suir]".

Sources

Further reading
 The golden vale of Ivowen: between Slievenamon and Suir Eoghan Ó Néill 2001 
 The book of the Galtees and the Golden Vein: a border history of Tipperary, Limerick & Cork Paul J. Flynn, 1926

Valleys of the Republic of Ireland
Landforms of County Cork
Landforms of County Tipperary
Landforms of County Limerick